Theriakisi may refer to several places in Greece:

Theriakisi, Aetolia-Acarnania, a village in Aetolia-Acarnania 
Theriakisi, Ioannina, a village in the Ioannina regional unit